The Cine Capri was a movie theater located in Phoenix, Arizona, United States, which operated from 1966 to 1998.

History

Construction
The original Cine Capri Theatre was located at the corner of 24th Street and Camelback Roads in Phoenix, Arizona. The theatre was owned by Paramount Studios, and its construction in 1964 required approval by the Federal District Court of New York to satisfy anti-trust laws. The building was designed by George M. Aurelius, vice-president and general manager of Arizona Paramount Corporation, Henry George Greene, consulting architect to ABC Theaters, W. E. (Bill) Homes, Jr., president of Homes & Son Construction Company, Ralph Haver, president of Haver, Nunn & Jensen, architects for Barrows Plaza, and Spero Kontos of the Los Angeles-based John Filbert Company.

The large,  facility featured dual colonnades flanking both sides of the theater; ten pre-cast white, columns weighing seven tons each. They were supported with overhangs with copper fascias cured to achieve an antique green patina. There was a large portico that served as the main entrance and a patio off the east lobby to provide shelter for waiting patrons and intermission breaks. The entire lower building façade was overlaid with imported hexagonal jade Italian tile. In the center was a multi-paneled, custom antique stained glass window which served as a focal point. Low profile desert landscaping surrounded the theatre, including palm, Russian Olive, and Italian cypress trees. Patrons could be see the Camelback Mountain and its Praying Monk rock formation from the two-level lobby.

A gold curtain moved vertically to reveal the title curtain behind, which opened horizontally to expose the film on a giant curved screen which extended out to the fifth row of seats.

The Cine Capri was the first multipurpose theater in the southwest specifically designed to project all film aspect ratios of the time, including Cinemascope, Vista-Vision, and Cinerama from its 70/35 mm projectors and stereophonic sound system.

Opening
The Cine Capri opened with the Charlton Heston film The Agony and the Ecstasy. On March 31, 1966, Charlton Heston hosted a youth drama clinic in the theater auditorium for several dozen high school and college students. This was followed by an afternoon “show & tell” reception for distinguished guests to personally meet Mr. Heston. Attendees included community leaders, city and state officials, the press, radio and television personnel, studio and distribution executives, and neighborhood merchants. Also there were the architects, contractors, members of the trade and craft suppliers, the Phoenix Art Council and the Mid Town Rotary Club, the sponsors of the evening charity program. Later Heston officially launched the theater with a ribbon cutting ceremony.

The 1977 movie Star Wars played at the Cine Capri for over a year - the longest run in the United States. The Cine Capri held one of the highest grosses for the George Lucas film.  Famed snowboard artist Joe Sorren painted an audience viewing a film, titled after the theater.

Demolition
After several years, the Arizona Paramount Corporation and ABC Paramount theaters disposed of their theater holdings and withdrew from the community. In 1988, the theater was renovated and re-opened by its new operator Harkins Theatres, a large privately owned movie theater chain.

In 1997, a year-long battle began between Harkins Theatres and the property owner over the decision to demolish the Cine Capri in favor of a high-rise office building. Despite over 260,000 petition signatures and efforts of the Save the Cine Capri Committee, as well as national publicity in Preservation magazine, the theater was demolished in 1998. The last film shown was Titanic.

Reconstructions
In 2003, a Cine Capri-style auditorium was built as part of the Scottsdale 101 theater complex in Phoenix. The Scottsdale 101 includes a Cine Capri museum which showcases memorabilia and photos from the original Cine Capri.

A second Cine Capri was built in Tempe, Arizona at the new Tempe Marketplace shopping center, along with 15 other movie screens. It is located on the Southwest corner of Loop 101 and Loop 202 Red Mountain. The new stadium-style theater has the same size screen and has 604 seats instead of 568. It pre-opened on June 28, 2007, with a one-night-only showing of the original 1977 Star Wars. The Grand Opening was on June 29, 2007; the opening film was Live Free or Die Hard.

Harkins also operates Cine Capri-style auditoriums at the Bricktown 16 theatre complex in Oklahoma City, Oklahoma, Northfield 18 theaters in Denver, Colorado, and at the Southlake Town Square in Southlake, Texas.

References

 Interviews and personal correspondence with George M. Aurelius, retired vice-president and general manager of The Arizona Paramount Company, by Gayle Homes Martin, July, 1998.
 Fuchs, Andreas and Melnick, Ross. "Cinema Treasures A New Look at Classic Movie Theaters."  MBI Publishing Company, St. Paul, MN. 2004.

Defunct companies based in Arizona
Movie theatre chains in the United States
Demolished buildings and structures in Arizona
Buildings and structures demolished in 1998
Former cinemas in the United States